Net Applications is a web analytics firm. The company is commonly known in the web browser development and technology news communities for its global market share statistics.

History
Since 1999, Net Applications is a source of applications for webmasters and eMarketers. Headquartered in Aliso Viejo, California, Net Applications distributes its services through over 7,000 partners and affiliates.

Criticism
While the statistics released by the company routinely place operating systems sold by Microsoft (Windows) and Apple (Mac OS X) with a high market share in the desktop computer category (through 2013), Vincent Vizzaccaro (EVP – Marketing and Strategic Alliances, Net Applications, 2002–present) has stated that Microsoft and Apple are among the company's clients.  The company has also admitted that their statistics are skewed.

See also
Usage share of web browsers
Usage share of operating systems
Web browser
Market share
Browser wars

References

External links

Internet properties established in 1999
Online companies of the United States
Web analytics
1999 establishments in the United States